Pumpkin is a large orange squash fruit (vegetable) of the genus Cucurbita.

Pumpkin may also refer to:

Entertainment
 Pumpkin (film), a 2002 film
 Pumpkin, a Buckethead album
 The Great Pumpkin, an unseen character from the comic strip Peanuts by Charles M. Schulz
 It's the Great Pumpkin, Charlie Brown, the third prime time animated television special from 1966, also based on the comic strip Peanuts by Charles M. Schulz
 The Great Pumpkin (film), 'Il grande cocomero', an Italian film (1993)
 Big Pumpkin, a 1992 children's book by Erica Silverman

People
 Pumpkin (musician), the early hip hop singer
 David S. Pumpkins, a Saturday Night Live character portrayed by Tom Hanks

Other uses
 Pumpkin (color), the color of the fruit
 Pumpkin, Georgia, a community in the United States
 Pumpkin case, a 2007 criminal investigation
 Pumpkin Café Shop, a chain of café shops in The UK
 Pumpkin suit, popular name for the orange colored space suits used by space shuttle crews.
 Pumpkin, an Anything Muppet pattern used on Sesame Street which is an orange rod puppet with a long, oval-shaped head
 The Smashing Pumpkins, an alternative rock band from Chicago
 The Splashing Pumpkins, an alternative name for Huey, Dewey, and Louie's house band on Disney's House of Mouse
 Pumpkin bomb, a weapon used in the Second World War
 The "Pumpkin Papers" from the prosecution of Alger Hiss
 colloquial term for a differential